Giacomo Bulgarelli (24 October 1940 – 12 February 2009) was an Italian international footballer who played as a midfielder. Regarded as one of Italy's greatest ever midfielders, Bulgarelli spent his entire club career with Italian side Bologna, where he also served as the team's captain; an important figure with the club, he is the team's record all-time appearance holder, and won the Serie A title with the Bolognese side in 1964, among other trophies. Following his retirement, he had a brief spell in America with the Hartford Bicentennials in 1975, and later also had a successful career as a football commentator in the 90s.

At international level, Bulgarelli represented Italy at the 1960 Summer Olympics in Rome, where the team finished in fourth place, and in two FIFA World Cups; he made his senior international debut at the 1962 edition of the tournament, and marked the occasion with two goals, becoming Italy's youngest ever World Cup goalscorer. He was also a member of the Italian side that won UEFA Euro 1968.

Club career
Bulgarelli was born in Portonovo di Medicina, Bologna.

His entire Italian club career was spent with Bologna, for whom he also served as captain. He made 391 Serie A appearances for the club between 1958–59 and 1974–75, as well as 54 in the Coppa Italia, 3 in the European Cup, 2 in the Cup Winners' Cup, 20 in the Inter-Cities Fairs Cup, 4 in the Mitropa Cup, and 2 in the Anglo-Italian League Cup; he scored 58 goals in all competitions, 43 of which came in Serie A.

He won the title with the club in 1964, after they defeated Herrera's "Grande" Inter Milan 2–0 in a play-off match; this was the only time in history that the league title had been decided in such a manner. He also won the Coppa Italia twice with the club during the 1970s, as well as a Mitropa Cup and an Anglo-Italian League Cup. With 488 appearances in all competitions, he is Bologna's record all-time appearance holder.

He finished his career with a brief spell in 1975 with the Hartford Bicentennials in the USA.

International career
Bulgarelli played three matches for Italy at the 1960 Summer Olympics.

He made his senior debut for the Italy national team at the 1962 World Cup, on 7 June, scoring two goals in a 3–0 win in Italy's final group match against Switzerland, which were unable to prevent the team from being eliminated in the first round. With these goals, he became the youngest ever goalscorer for Italy at the FIFA World Cup, at the age of  21 years and 226 days. He played all three matches for Italy at the 1966 World Cup. Throughout the tournament, he also featured as the team's captain ahead of Sandro Salvadore in the team's infamous and historic 1–0 defeat to North Korea in Middlesbrough, on 19 July, which led to the Italians' elimination from the World Cup. During the match, Bulgarelli was forced off due to a knee injury when the score was still 0–0, leaving the Italians a man down for the remainder of the match, as substitutions were not permitted at the time. His only other appearance as Italy's captain came on 18 June 1966, in a friendly match against Austria.

He was a member of the Italy squad that won the 1968 UEFA European Championship on home soil, where his leadership and experience played an important role in the team's success, even though he did not appear throughout the final stages of the tournament; his last international appearance came against Romania, in 1967. He made a total of 29 appearances for the Italy national side, scoring 7 times.

Style of play
Bulgarelli was a tenacious, hard-working, and complete midfielder, who was known for his positional sense, consistency, and footballing intelligence, as well as his influence and leadership on the pitch. In addition to being adept defensively as a ball-winner, where he excelled at breaking down plays and subsequently distributing the ball to teammates, he also possessed excellent vision, passing ability and technical skills, and was therefore also capable of setting the tempo of his team in midfield as a playmaker. He was also known for his offensive attributes, which saw him score several goals from midfield. Fabio Capello described him as Italy's greatest ever midfielder.

After retirement
After his retirement from professional football, he worked as a sporting director, and he also had a successful career as a football commentator and pundit, in particular during the 90s, working with RAI, Mediaset, and La Gazzetta dello Sport; he also partnered up with fellow pundit Massimo Caputi to provide the Italian commentary for the EA Sports FIFA video game series from 1998–2002.

He died in Bologna, on 12 February 2009, after a lengthy illness.

Outside of football
On 3 July 1968, Bulgarelli founded the Italian Footballers' Association (AIC), in Milan, along with several fellow footballers, such as Gianni Rivera, Sandro Mazzola, Ernesto Castano, Giancarlo De Sisti, and Giacomo Losi, as well as the recently retired Sergio Campana, also a lawyer, who was appointed president of the association.

Honours

Club
Bologna
Serie A: 1963–64
Coppa Italia: 1969–70, 1973–74
Mitropa Cup: 1961
Anglo-Italian League Cup: 1970

International
Italy
UEFA European Championship: 1968

Individual
Italian Football Hall of Fame: 2014 (Posthumous honour)

References

1940 births
2009 deaths
Sportspeople from the Metropolitan City of Bologna
1962 FIFA World Cup players
1966 FIFA World Cup players
Bologna F.C. 1909 players
Connecticut Bicentennials players
Italian footballers
Italian expatriate footballers
Italy international footballers
Footballers at the 1960 Summer Olympics
Olympic footballers of Italy
Serie A players
North American Soccer League (1968–1984) players
UEFA Euro 1968 players
UEFA European Championship-winning players
Expatriate soccer players in the United States
Association football midfielders
Footballers from Emilia-Romagna